The Chiloango River (also known as Kakongo River, Louango, Shiloango and Rio Hi) is a river in western Central Africa. It forms the westernmost part of the border between the Democratic Republic of the Congo and the Republic of Congo, and then forms approximately half of the border between the DRC and Cabinda, Angola passing just south of the town of Necuto. The river then bisects Cabinda, making it the most important river in the province. It enters the Atlantic Ocean just north of the town of Cacongo.

Notes

Rivers of the Republic of the Congo
Rivers of the Democratic Republic of the Congo
Rivers of Angola
International rivers of Africa
Democratic Republic of the Congo–Republic of the Congo border
Angola–Democratic Republic of the Congo border
Border rivers